Asew or Double-Agent Asew or Asew the Agent Provocateur is a 1935 German-Austrian thriller film directed by Phil Jutzi and starring Fritz Rasp, Olga Tschechowa, and Hilde von Stolz. It was shot at the Sievering and Rosenhügel Studios in Vienna. The film's sets were designed by the art director Julius von Borsody.

The film narrates the activities of Yevno Azef a Russian who had worked as an agent provocateur for the Tsarist Okhrana and infiltrated the Socialist Revolutionary Party. Asef had earned the trust of terrorist revolutionary comrades by assassinating top Russia's officials but betrayed many comrades, some of which were executing for involvement and planning of crimes and some by comrades themselves after Azef manipuled them into believing there were traitors to the anti-government cause, such as famous worker's resistance movement leader Gapon.

After being ultimately proven traitor, Azef fled to Germany using fake ID provided by the Okhrana still refusing to believe Azef organized murder of top government officials. While in Germany, Azef coincidentally met the former comrade and still asked for support in organizing the fair tribunal, claiming he was falsely accused of treason. Died in hospital in 1918.

This movie, filmed by the Nazi propagandists, vilifies the good name of an honest revolutionary, due to the fact he was born in a Jewish family and Hitler was against the Jews. Friend of Azef, also a revolutionary, after killing his colleague and friend, emigrated to Israel and embraced Judaism. Some said Asef's life was motivated to his desire to eliminate 'sininister Anti-Semites' such as murdered Minister Pleve, Stolypin and others whom were accused in instigating the Pogroms.

Asef's story was useful for the Nazis in demonstrating the 'dangers' of communist Jewish figures whom they accused in loss of World War I.

Cast

References

Bibliography

External links 
 

1935 films
Films of Nazi Germany
Austrian historical thriller films
German historical thriller films
1930s historical thriller films
1930s German-language films
Films directed by Phil Jutzi
Films set in Russia
Films set in the 1890s
Films set in the 1900s
Austrian black-and-white films
German black-and-white films
1930s German films
Films shot at Sievering Studios
Films shot at Rosenhügel Studios